The Archives of Natural History (formerly the Journal of the Society for the Bibliography of Natural History) is a peer-reviewed academic journal and the official journal of the Society for the History of Natural History. It publishes papers on the history and bibliography of natural history in its broadest sense, and in all periods and all cultures. This includes botany, geology, palaeontology and zoology, the lives of naturalists, their publications, correspondence and collections, and the institutions and societies to which they belong. Bibliographical papers concerned with the study of rare books, manuscripts and illustrative material, and analytical and enumerative bibliographies are also published.

The Archives of Natural History was established in 1936 as the Journal of the Society for the Bibliography of Natural History, adopting its current title of Archives of Natural History in 1981. The honorary editor, from June 2017 until September 2020, was Herman Reichenbach. Archives of Natural History has been published for the Society by Edinburgh University Press since 2008.

External links
 
 The Society for the History of Natural History
 Archives of Natural History on Society website

Publications established in 1936
English-language journals
Edinburgh University Press academic journals
Biannual journals
History of science journals
1936 establishments in the United Kingdom